Holiday is the fourth studio album by the American folk rock band America, released on the Warner Bros. Records label in June 1974. The album was produced in London by longtime Beatles record producer George Martin, the first of seven consecutive albums he produced with America.

The album was a big hit in the US, reaching number 3 on the Billboard album chart and being certified gold by the RIAA. It produced two hit singles: "Tin Man" reached number 4 on the Billboard singles chart and went to number 1 on the adult contemporary chart; and "Lonely People" which peaked at number 5 on the Billboard singles chart and also hit number 1 on the adult contemporary chart. Several other songs received radio airplay on FM stations playing album tracks, including "Baby It's Up To You" and "Another Try".
The album was also released on Quadrophonic reel-to-reel tape for 4-channel enthusiasts.

History
Band member Dewey Bunnell was thrilled at the prospect of working with Martin as producer. He was quoted as saying that it "was great working with George. It was like we knew each other. We were familiar with the Beatles, of course, and we had that British sense of humor."
In a separate interview, Dan Peek recalled to Circus magazine: "Gerry (Beckley) had been in England, and we'd talked about using George Martin as our producer. He's such a hot arranger, thinking about all the stuff he's done. There were several other people we wanted to use, but that idea sort of flashed and George was available."

It was the recording debut of America's longtime drummer Willie Leacox, who is in the car in the cover photo.

Reception

In his Allmusic review music critic Mike DeGagne noted the effect of George Martin's production on the album as well as the rebound from the failure of Hat Trick, writing "this album as a whole ascertained that the group was definitely showing their true potential once more."

Track listing

Personnel
America
 Dewey Bunnell - vocals, guitars
 Gerry Beckley - vocals, guitars, keyboards, bass
 Dan Peek - vocals, bass, guitars, keyboards
with:
 Willie Leacox - drums, percussion
Technical
 George Martin - producer, arranger, keyboards
 Geoff Emerick - engineering
 Peter Henderson - tape operator
 Gary Burden - art direction

Charts

Certifications

References

1974 albums
America (band) albums
Albums produced by George Martin
Albums arranged by George Martin
Warner Records albums